Wenceslaus, Wenceslas, Wenzeslaus and Wenzslaus (and other similar names) are Latinized forms of the Czech name Václav. It is an archaic Polish male given name descending from the Polish word Węzel/Wenzel, Latinised as Wenceslaus spelling for Czech rulers called Vaclav. It is a very old Lechitic word and name also used in other West Slavic languages such as CzechSlavic dithematic name (of two lexemes), derived from the Slavic words veli/vyache/więce/više ("great(er), large(r)"), and slava ("glory, fame"), both very common in Slavic names. It roughly means "greater glory". Latinised name Wenceslaus corresponds to several West Slavic, Lechitic given names, such as Wieceslaw, Wiecejslav, Wieńczysław/Vienceslav, Vjenceslav, Wenzel, Węzel, Wacław/Vaclav and a few more. 

People named Wenceslaus or spelling variations thereof include:

 Wenceslaus I, Duke of Bohemia (907–935 or 929), saint and subject of the Christmas carol "Good King Wenceslas"
 Wenceslaus II, Duke of Bohemia (died 1192)
 Wenceslaus I of Bohemia (c. 1205–1253), King of Bohemia
 Wenceslaus II of Bohemia (1271–1305), King of Bohemia and Poland
 Wenceslaus III of Bohemia (1289–1306), King of Hungary, Bohemia, and Poland
 Wenceslaus IV of Bohemia (1361–1419), King of Bohemia, and German King
 Wenceslaus I of Legnica (c. 1318–1364)
 Wenceslaus I, Duke of Luxembourg (1337–1383), the first Duke
 Charles IV, Holy Roman Emperor (1316–1378), born Wenceslaus
 Wenceslaus Hollar (1607–1677), Bohemian etcher
 Wenceslaus Hanka (1791–1861), Bohemian philologist
 Venceslaus Ulricus Hammershaimb (1819–1909), Faroese minister and linguist
 Venceslau Brás (1868–1966), 9th President of Brazil
 Vjenceslav Richter (1917–2002), Croatian architect
 Vjenceslav Novak (1859–1905), Croatian writer

See also 

 Václav
 Wenzel
 Boleslaus, cognate
 Višeslav, South Slavic cognate
 Wenceslao, Spanish variant
 Ventsislav, Bulgarian variant
 Venckus Lithuanian variant
 Vyacheslav Russian and Ukrainian variant

Slavic masculine given names